The Academia Catarinense de Letras (ACL) (English: Catarinense Academy of Letters) is a Brazilian literary non-profit society, and it is the maximum literary authority in the State of Santa Catarina.

The ACL is located in the city of Florianópolis, at the Centro Integrado de Cultura Professor Henrique da Silva
Fontes (CIC) (English: Integrated Cultural Center).

History
With the objective to promote the literary production and congregate the men of letters in Santa Catarina, the Sociedade Catharinense de Letras (Catarinense
Society of Letters) was formed on October 30, 1920, from an invitation of José Boiteux.

The idea had been initiated twice in the previous decade by the then young writer Othon da Gama Lobo d'Eça, but it did not take off. But in May 1921 it had its statutes approved and fourteen founding members occupied their chairs. The Patrons for each chair were chosen, and distributed in alphabetical order.

In 1924, inspired by the Academia Brasileira de Letras, the society changes its name to Academia Catarinense de Letras. At the time, sixteen of the forty chairs were still vacant.

Differently from similar academies, the ACL has accepted women in their ranks from the very beginning, with Delminda Silveira being the first
member of the chair number 10, and Maura de Senna Pereira the first member of chair number 38.

Composition
The Academia Catarinense de Letras is composed by forty writers either born in Santa Catarina or that made history in the State.
The chairs are lifetime positions, that is, new members can only be chosen after the death of a current member. When a chair is vacant, the
Academy organizes an election between the remaining members to choose the new member. Any writer can postulate the chair, as long as they have a
published book. The members of the Academy are called "immortals".

List of the immortals and their chairs

External links
Website of the Academia Catarinense de Letras (in Portuguese)

1924 establishments in Brazil
Brazilian literature
Academy of Letters